Center for American Education (CAE) was the old name referring to the American style educational institutions in Asia. These institutions have changed their names: 

 American College of Dubai; formerly known as Center for American Education, Dubai. It is usually confused with American University in Dubai.
 International Center For Management and Indian Studies, formerly known as Center for American Education, Bangalore.